The 1907 Lafayette football team was an American football team that represented Lafayette College as an independent during the 1907 college football season. In its fifth and final season under head coach Alfred E. Bull, the team compiled a 7–2–1 record, shut out five opponents, and outscored all opponents by a total of 198 to 50. Charles Ellicott was the team captain. The team played its home games at March Field in Easton, Pennsylvania.

Schedule

References

Lafayette
Lafayette Leopards football seasons
Lafayette football